Plemstall (formerly Plemonstall) is a hamlet in the civil parish of Mickle Trafford and District, Cheshire, England. It lies northeast of the village of Mickle Trafford.

The hamlet contains only a farm and former level crossing keeper's house, in addition to the Grade I listed St Peter's Church. The church stands on a slightly elevated area which was known as "The Isle of Chester", the surrounding area formerly being marsh. The church is believed to have been built on the site of Plegmund's hermitage, who is believed to have lived in there before he became Archbishop of Canterbury in AD 890.

 
It is one of two holy wells in west Cheshire.

See also

St Plegmund's well
St Peter's Church, Plemstall

References

External links

Villages in Cheshire
Cheshire West and Chester